Élisée or Elisée is a masculine given name of French origin which may refer to:

 Élisée Dionne (1828–1892), Canadian politician
 Élisée Maclet (1881–1962), French Impressionist painter
 Élisée Reclus (1830–1905), French geographer, writer and anarchist
 Elisée Reverchon (1834–1914), French botanical collector
 Eliseé Sou (born 1999), Burkinabé footballer
 Élisée Thériault (1884–1958), Canadian lawyer and politician in Quebec

See also
 Élysée (disambiguation)

French masculine given names